Type 64 may refer to:

 Type 64 MAT, anti-tank missile, Japan, introduced 1964
 Type 64 pistol, semi-automatic pistol, China, introduced 1980
 Type 64 (silenced pistol), silenced pistol, China, introduced 1964
 Type 64 submachine gun, sound-suppressed submachine gun, China, introduced c. 1966
 Howa Type 64, battle rifle, Japan, introduced 1964
 Type 64 (tank), light tank, Taiwan, introduced 1975
 Porsche 64, also known as the Type 64, the first automobile from what was to become the Porsche company